Robert Edward Alexander (September 1911, in Christchurch – 9 May 1988, in Christchurch) was a New Zealand cricket player who appeared in only one first-class match, for Canterbury in the 1933–34 season.

External links
CricketArchive Profile

1911 births
1988 deaths
New Zealand cricketers
Canterbury cricketers